Rachel Hampton (born 24 January 1975 in Whyalla, South Australia) is a State and National League representative in field hockey, coach, manager, performance analyst and indigenous sportswoman from South Australia.

Club career
Hampton started her career with Woodville Hockey club in 1988 before moving to Port Adelaide District Hockey Club in 1993 playing Premier League where she was an eight-time premiership player in 1993, 1995, 1996, 1998, 2001, 2002, 2003 and 2005. She was named Hockey SA best and fairest in 2005. Hampton returned to Woodville Hockey Club in 2007 and continued to play until 2013 where she won the club's Best and Fairest.

State career
Hampton demonstrated leadership in state junior teams where she was named captain of the State's Under 16 (1991), Under 18 (1993) and Co-Captain Under 21(1996) before co-captaining the Souther Suns (2003) in the National Hockey League during her time at National League level from 1995 - 2009.

Coaching and High Performance
Since retiring from National League representation, Hampton has been involved in High Performance coaching and team management programs in South Australia since 2008 in both men's and women's junior state teams, Australian Hockey League's Southern Suns, South Australian Sports Institute programs and South Australian Women's Indoor Hockey.

References

1975 births
Living people
Australian female field hockey players
Sportswomen from South Australia
Field hockey people from South Australia
Indigenous Australian sportspeople
People from Whyalla
Australian field hockey coaches